The discography of American rapper Birdman consists of 5 studio albums (4 as a solo artist, and 1 collaborative album with rapper Lil Wayne), 2 mixtapes, 23 music videos, 48 singles, including 23 as a featured artist, and 7 promotional singles. In 2002, Birdman released his debut studio album Birdman (also known under the title Baby aka the #1 Stunna) under the recording name Baby. It peaked at number 24 on the US Billboard 200, spending 23 weeks on the chart. Three singles were released from the album; the first, "Do That...", reached number 33 on the US Billboard Hot 100, and the second, "What Happened to That Boy", reached number 45 on the same chart. The third single, "Baby You Can Do It", only charted on the US Hot R&B/Hip-Hop Singles Sales chart. In 2003, Birdman collaborated with singer Ginuwine on the single "Hell Yeah" and rapper Bow Wow on the single "Let's Get Down", which reached numbers 17 and 14 respectively on the Hot 100.

In 2005, Birdman released his second album Fast Money. It peaked at number 9 on the Billboard 200, and the album's two singles, "Get Your Shine On" and "Neck of the Woods", both charted in the top 75 of the US Hot R&B/Hip-Hop Songs chart. In 2006, Birdman released Like Father, Like Son, a collaboration album with fellow rapper Lil Wayne. It peaked at number three on the Billboard 200 and topped the Top R&B/Hip-Hop Albums and Top Rap Albums charts. Like Father, Like Son produced four singles, including "Stuntin' Like My Daddy", which peaked at number 21 on the Hot 100. Birdman's third studio album 5 * Stunna was released in 2007, and included the singles "Pop Bottles" – which peaked at number 38 on the Hot 100 – "100 Million" and "I Run This".

Birdman's fourth studio album Priceless was released in 2009. It peaked at number 33 on the Billboard 200, number 5 on the Top R&B/Hip-Hop Albums chart and number 3 on the Top Rap Albums chart. Priceless included four singles; "Always Strapped", which peaked at number 54 on the Hot 100, "Written on Her", "Money to Blow", which peaked at number 26 on the Hot 100 and was certified platinum by the Recording Industry Association of America (RIAA), and "4 My Town (Play Ball)", which peaked at number 92 on the Hot 100. In 2010, Birdman, Lil Wayne and singer Jay Sean appeared on the Kevin Rudolf single "I Made It (Cash Money Heroes)", which reached number 21 on the Hot 100 and charted in Australia, New Zealand and the United Kingdom. Since 2010, Birdman has also released the singles "Loyalty", "Fire Flame", "I Get Money", "Y.U. Mad" and "Born Stunna", all of which have reached the top 65 of the Hot R&B/Hip-Hop Songs chart.

Albums

Studio albums

Collaboration albums

Mixtapes

Collaborative mixtapes

Singles

As lead artist

As featured artist

Promotional singles

Other charted and certified songs

Guest appearances

Music videos

As lead artist

See also 
 Big Tymers discography
 Cash Money Millionaires discography

Notes

References

External links 
 
 Birdman at AllMusic
 
 

Discographies of American artists
Hip hop discographies